Fender Bender is a 2016 American slasher film by writer and director Mark Pavia.  Fender Bender is the first film co-produced with ChillerTV and Shout! Factory, it went into production on November 4, 2015. Shout! Factory developed, financed, and distributed the film and it premiered on ChillerTV June 3, 2016  after a limited theater release on May 23, 2016. The film was shot on location and is set in New Mexico, and follows a 17-year-old girl being stalked by a serial killer.

Plot
Hilary (Makenzie Vega), a 17-year-old girl, gets into a fender bender shortly after obtaining her driver’s license. She innocently provides all of her information to the other driver (Bill Sage). When Hilary returns home, her parents are angry at her, though the stranger rear-ended her. As a result, they go on holiday without her, leaving her alone and vulnerable. Hilary invites her friends, Rachel and Erik, over and receives a text from the stranger. She has unwittingly become the next victim as the mysterious driver stalks her suburban home later that stormy night while Erik, Rachel, and she defend themselves. Complicating matters is Hilary’s ex-boyfriend, who appears on the doorstep drunk.

Cast
 Makenzie Vega as Hilary Diaz
 Dre Davis as Rachel
 Cassidy Freeman as Jennifer
 Kelsey Montoya  as Erik
 Harrison Sim as Andy
 Steven Michael Quezada as Mario
 Lora Cunningham  as Olga
 Bill Sage as the Driver

Release
Fender Bender was released by Shout! Factory on June 3, 2016 airing on Chiller TV. Shout! Factory released the film on Blu-ray and DVD format on October 4, 2016.

Reception
Felix Vasquez Jr. of Cinema Crazed stated that he was "expecting almost nothing and was shocked at how effective it was in the end. It’s a solid stalk and chase slasher film mixing "Death Proof" and "The Hitcher" and director Pavia delivers a strong genre entry suitable for a lazy Friday night and some beers." Matt Donato of We Got This Covered  was more lukewarm indicating that although "Makenzie Vega asserts herself as a future genre star," "filmmaker Mark Pavia dilutes an original idea with stale, musty slasher generics that have been dominating too many of my reviews lately.  A select few moments shine – mostly involving gnarly gore effects – but the sum of this creepy driver’s rampage is nothing but a bland home invasion/slasher wannabe told through a weak, timid voice." Jake Dee of The Joblo Network rates the film a 5 out of 10 citing lack of originality and "over-trampled" "Halloween-like tropes" as drawbacks while redemption comes in the slick pacing and ever increasing gore and violence culminating in its avoidance of a pat Hollywood ending which "make the movie a bit better than perhaps it should be."

Notes

References
 Rotten Tomatoes Fender Bender Review
 Exclusive by Brent Lang at Variety
 “A Crash Course in Terror” at Horrorpedia
 Review by Felix Vasquez at Cinema Crazed
 Review by Matt Donato at We Got This Covered
 Daily Dead
 Bloody Disgusting
 Horror World
 Horrorphilia

External links
 
 

2016 horror films
American slasher films
2010s English-language films
2010s American films